The II Cavalry Corps ( literally: Higher Cavalry Command 2) was a formation of the German Army in the First World War. The corps was formed on mobilization of the German Army in August 1914 and dissolved 23 January 1915 as the onset of trench warfare in the west negated the requirement for large cavalry formations.  It was commanded throughout its existence by  Georg von der Marwitz.

Combat chronicle 
Initially on the Western Front with the 2nd, 4th and 9th Cavalry Divisions preceding the 1st and 2nd Armies. Withdrawn to Belgium at the end of November 1914; dissolved 23 January 1915.

Order of Battle on mobilisation 
The Corps consisted of three cavalry divisions (with seven  battalions attached) without corps troops; in supply and administration matters, the cavalry divisions were autonomous. The commander was only concerned with tactics and strategy, hence his title of Senior Cavalry Commander .

On formation in August 1914, the corps consisted of:
 2nd Cavalry Division
 4th Cavalry Division
 9th Cavalry Division
 Guards Jäger Battalion
 Guards Schützen Battalion
 3rd Jäger Battalion
 4th Jäger Battalion
 7th Jäger Battalion
 9th Jäger Battalion
 10th Jäger Battalion

Each cavalry division consisted of three cavalry brigades (six regiments each of four squadrons), a horse artillery detachment with three four-gun batteries, a machine gun detachment (company sized, six machine-guns), plus pioneers, signals and a motor vehicle column.  A more detailed Table of Organisation and Equipment can be seen here. The Jäger battalions each consisted of four light infantry companies, a machine gun company (six machine-guns), a cyclist company and a motorised vehicle column.

Commanders 
II Cavalry Corps was commanded throughout its existence by  Georg von der Marwitz.

See also 

 German Army (German Empire)
 German Army order of battle (1914)
 German cavalry in World War I
 TOE, German Cavalry Division, August 1914

References

Bibliography 
 

Corps of Germany in World War I
Cavalry corps of Germany
Military units and formations established in 1914
Military units and formations disestablished in 1915